Golden Icons Academy Awards (GIAMA) is an annual film award in the diaspora to reward outstanding contribution to the African film industry. The first edition was held in Houston, Texas, United States. The most recent ceremony was held in Stafford Center Performing Art Theater on October 19, 2013. The most recent ceremony was the 4th edition in the United States, no award ceremony was held in 2016.

Ceremonies
2012 Golden Icons Academy Movie Awards
2013 Golden Icons Academy Movie Awards
2014 Golden Icons Academy Movie Awards
2015 Golden Icons Academy Movie Awards

Categories
Best Motion Picture
Best Drama
Best Cinematography
Best Comedy
Best Costume
Most Promising Actress (Best New Actress)
Best Actress
Best Supporting Actress
Most Promising Actor (Best New Actor)
Best Actor
Best Supporting Actor
Best Director
Best Indigenous
Best Original Screenplay
Best Sound
Producer of the Year
Best Original Soundtrack
Best Film Diaspora
Most Promising Actor – Diaspora
Most Promising Actress- Diaspora

References

External links
Official Website
Golden Icons on YouTube

Nigerian film awards
African film awards